The Anderson Boarding House is a historic boarding house at 201 North Main Street in Clarendon, Arkansas.

Description and history 
Built in 1921, it is one of the city's finest examples of Craftsman architecture, with a projecting front porch, and exposed rafter ends. It is the only known building in the city that was purpose-built as a boarding house, with a first floor layout that has three rooms on each side of a narrow hall, and a dining hall at the rear.

The house was listed on the National Register of Historic Places on November 1, 1984. It may have been demolished.

See also
National Register of Historic Places listings in Monroe County, Arkansas

References

Houses on the National Register of Historic Places in Arkansas
Houses completed in 1921
Houses in Monroe County, Arkansas
National Register of Historic Places in Monroe County, Arkansas